Sternatia (Griko: , translit. ) is a small town and comune in the province of Lecce, Apulia, southern Italy. It is one of the nine towns of Grecìa Salentina where the greek dialect Griko is spoken.

References

Grecìa Salentina
Localities of Salento